
Mallampalli Somasekhara Sarma (1891 – 7 January 1963) was an Indian historian, who worked at the Andhra University.

The Mallampalli Somasekhara Sarma Historical Research Foundation was established in Visakhapatnam in honour of Sarma. It awards annual memorial awards in his name to acclaimed historians of Andhra.

Works 
 A Forgotten Chapter of Andhra History (History of the Musunūri Nāyaks), Andhra University, 1945.
 History of Reddi Kingdoms (circa. 1325 A.D. to circa 1448 A.D.), Andhra University, 1946.

The two books Forgotten Chapter and History of Reddi Kingdoms deal with the immediate aftermath of the fall of the Kakatiya Empire, the former covering the history of Musunuri Nayakas and the latter the history of Reddi kingdoms.

Reception 
Sarma hypothesised that the Reddi kings were subordinate to the Musunuri chiefs during their inception:

The theory was criticised by historian M. Rama Rao, who noted that the founder of the Reddi line, Prolaya Vema Reddi, predated Musunuri Kapaya Nayaka. He concludes:

Modern historian Cynthia Talbot has warned against taking the inscriptional evidence at face value.

She also demonstrated that Musunuri Kapaya Nayaka being a lord of 75 subordinates was a formulaic device.

References

1963 deaths
1891 births
20th-century Indian historians
Historians of India
History of Andhra Pradesh